Noemi Oineza (born October 7, 1999) is a Filipino actress and model. She is best known for her role as Lottie in Princess Sarah. She is also a child star on Goin' Bulilit. Later, she played villainous roles in Wansapanataym, Mirabella, and Aryana, until becoming the protagonist in Maalaala Mo Kaya.

Filmography

Television

Film

References

1999 births
Living people
Filipino female models
Filipino television actresses